Amigos y Rivales KR 2  is the second season of the Peruvian reality show: Amigos y Rivales KR who mix different talents: Dancing, singing and acting, where six couples of famous people will compete with each other.

Couples

Progress

 This couple was saved in the challenge to go to Risk for the audience.
 This couple won the week challenge and was safe to go to Risk.
 This couple lose the challenge and go to Risk, winning it.
 This couple lose the challenge and go to Risk, and was saved for the audience.
 This couple lose the challenge and go to Risk, and wasn't saved for nobody, being eliminated.
 This couple lose the challenge and is actually in Risk.

References

Peruvian reality television series